Chumli is a rural locality (a selo) in Kaytagsky District, Republic of Dagestan, Russia. The population was 1,870 as of 2010. There are 14 streets.

Geography 
Chumli is located on the Yangichay River, 18 km northwest of Madzhalis (the district's administrative centre) by road. Gulli and Yangikent are the nearest rural localities.

Nationalities 
Dargins live there.

References 

Rural localities in Kaytagsky District